Kolob is a rural locality (a selo) and the administrative center of Kolobsky Selsoviet, Tlyaratinsky District, Republic of Dagestan, Russia. The population was 366 as of 2010.

Geography 
Kolob is located 33 km southeast of Tlyarata (the district's administrative centre) by road. Tlyanada is the nearest rural locality.

References 

Rural localities in Tlyaratinsky District